David Winning is a Canadian-American film and television director, screenwriter, producer, editor, and occasional actor. Although Winning has worked in numerous film and TV genres, his name is most commonly associated with science fiction, thrillers and drama.

Life and career
Winning was born in Calgary, Alberta. He became a dual citizen of the US and Canada in 2003 and lives in Los Angeles. He was making films at age ten with a Super 8 camera. In 1979, he received a Canada Council grant to make the sixteen millimeter drama Sequence, and expanded the plotline into his first feature film Storm, filmed in the summer of 1983 in Bragg Creek, Alberta.  It was shot with money that his father had set aside for film school and was screened at Cannes. It took four years to finish and was released by Golan-Globus' Cannon Films International and Warner Home Video in 1988.   A December 11, 1989 Los Angeles Times review called the film "taut, ambitious and darkly comic".

At 27, he directed episodes of Friday the 13th: The Series for Paramount and received three Gemini Award nominations.  His second feature Killer Image followed in 1992; the mystery-thriller starred Michael Ironside and M. Emmet Walsh.  Throughout the 1990s and 2000s he directed 45 movies and episodes of twenty-nine series, including Stargate: Atlantis, ABC's Dinotopia filmed in Budapest, Nickelodeon’s Are You Afraid of the Dark?, and four seasons on Gene Roddenberry's Andromeda.  He directed Kim Cattrall, Sean Young, and Eric McCormack in the award-winning thriller Exception to the Rule.  His biggest budget studio movie to date is the $29-million kids sci-fi action sequel Turbo: A Power Rangers Movie for 20th Century Fox. He directed seven episodes of the Cannell police series Street Justice with Carl Weathers.   Winning said "Episodic TV gets no respect" in a March 2000 Toronto Star interview.  He directed a 16-year-old Ryan Gosling in the Pilot and seven episodes of the Paramount UPN kid series Breaker High.

According to the February 2010 Avatar issue of Sci Fi Magazine, he was slated to direct the movie Sinbad: The Fifth Voyage with Patrick Stewart.
He directed episodes of Space Channel's comedy/horror series Todd and the Book of Pure Evil and Lost Girl for SYFY Channel and Showcase—and supervised and directed the far north webisode series YUKONIC online in 2011. He is directing XIII: The Series with Stuart Townsend, produced by Roger Avary for French Canal +, and multiple episodes of the live audience multi-camera sitcom Mr. Young for The Disney Channel. In 2017 he became one of the house directors on the Netflix / SYFY channel series Van Helsing; an explosive post-apocalyptic take on the vampire rising based on a graphic novel.  He also started directing over a dozen Christmas and family films for the Hallmark Channel; including A Summer Romance, Tulips in Spring, A December Bride, and Unleashing Mr. Darcy, which broke the network record on social media with 47 Million tweets.

Awards
Winning has won the 1995 Gold Hugo Award and two Silver Plaques from the Chicago International Film Festival, and four national Gemini Award nominations for Best Director/Dramatic Series.  In 2002 he accepted the first national team award from the Directors Guild of Canada Best TV series Drama for Twice in a Lifetime and was nominated again in 2006.  His episode of Stargate: Atlantis, "Childhood’s End", won three awards for Directing; New York, Houston and Chicago in 2005.  In April 2008, Winning won two Directing awards at the Houston Film Festival/WorldFest in Texas and a Special Jury Award for his work on the Lifetime Television vampire series Blood Ties.

2008 Hawaii Career Award and festival screenings
Winning was honored at the 2008 Big Island Film Festival in Hawaii. He received a Special Career award on May 17, 2008 with a reception in his honor in Waikōloa Village. Swamp Devil also won the Golden Honu for Best Foreign feature film. A doublebill of his two monster movies was presented at the outdoor festival; Swamp Devil starring Bruce Dern and Black Swarm starring Robert Englund. The first in his trilogy was Something Beneath with Kevin Sorbo in 2007. Black Swarm also screened at the Boston Film Festival on Friday the 13th of June, 2008. Both films were produced in Montreal by Muse Entertainment for the SYFY Channel, New York City.

Filmography

Film

Television films and series

References

External links

1961 births
Canadian television directors
Living people
Film directors from Calgary
Canadian film editors
Canadian male screenwriters
Canadian expatriate film directors in the United States
20th-century Canadian screenwriters
21st-century Canadian screenwriters